Adendro railway station is a railway station that serves the village of Adendro in the municipality of Chalkidona, Thessaloniki regional unit, Greece. Opened in 1894 in what was then the Ottoman Empire, it is located just north of the village centre. The station is served by Regional stopping services Florina, Kalambaka, Palaiofarsalos and Thessaloniki, and since 9 September 2007 by Proastiakos Thessaloniki services to Larissa, Edessa, and Thessaloniki. It was the site of a serious railway accident on 13 May 2017 in which three people were killed.

History
Opened in 1894 as Kirtzilar railway station in what was then the Ottoman Empire, at the completion of the Société du Chemin de Fer ottoman Salonique-Monastir, a branchline of the Chemins de fer Orientaux from Thessaloniki to Bitola. During this period Northern Greece and the southern Balkans where still under Ottoman rule, and Adendro was known as Kirtzilar. Adendro was annexed by Greece on 18 October 1912 during the First Balkan War. On 17 October 1925 The Greek government purchased the Greek sections of the former Salonica Monastir railway and the railway became part of the Hellenic State Railways, with the remaining section north of Florina seeded to Yugoslavia. In 1927 the station along with the settlement was renamed Adendro. On 9 September 2007, the station reopened. In 1970 OSE became the legal successor to the SEK, taking over responsibilities for most of Greece's rail infrastructure.

On 1 January 1971 the station, and most of Greek rail infrastructure where transferred to the Hellenic Railways Organisation S.A., a state-owned corporation. Freight traffic declined sharply when the state-imposed monopoly of OSE for the transport of agricultural products and fertilisers ended in the early 1990s. Many small stations of the network with little passenger traffic were closed down. In 2001 the infrastructure element of OSE was created, known as GAIAOSE, it would henceforth be responsible for the maintenance, of stations, bridges and other elements of the network, as well as the leasing and the sale of railway assists. In 2003, OSE launched "Proastiakos SA", as a subsidiary to serve the operation of the suburban network in the urban complex of Athens during the 2004 Olympic Games. In 2005, TrainOSE was created as a brand within OSE to concentrate on rail services and passenger interface.

Since 2007, the station is served by the Proastiakos Thessaloniki services to New Railway Station. In 2009, with the Greek debt crisis unfolding OSE's Management was forced to reduce services across the network. Timetables were cut back and routes closed as the government-run entity attempted to reduce overheads. In 2008, all Proastiakos were transferred from OSE to TrainOSE. In 2017 OSE's passenger transport sector was privatised as TrainOSE, currently, a wholly owned subsidiary of Ferrovie dello Stato Italiane infrastructure, including stations, remained under the control of OSE. In July 2022, the station began being served by Hellenic Train, the rebranded TranOSE.

Facilities
The station has waiting rooms and a staffed ticket office within the original 19th-century building. There is lift access to the platforms. There is a taxi rank and Parking in the forecourt.

Services
The station is served by Regional stopping services to Palaiofarsalos, Thessaloniki and Florina, and since 9 September 2007 by Proastiakos Thessaloniki services to Katerini and Larissa, Edessa, and Thessaloniki.

Accidents and incidents

2017 accident

On 13 May 2017, an Intercity nonstopping passenger train derailed and collided with a house in Adendro. Three people were killed and ten were injured. A preliminary report stated that the cause of the accident had been excessive speed.

Station layout

See also
Railway stations in Greece
Hellenic Railways Organization
Hellenic Train
Proastiakos
P.A.Th.E./P.

References

Railway stations in Central Macedonia
Railway stations opened in 1894
Buildings and structures in Central Macedonia